Arkyt may refer to the following places:

Arkyt, Altai Republic, a village in eastern Russia
Arkyt, Kyrgyzstan, a village in western Kyrgyzstan